I Was a Sixth Grade Alien! (known as My Best Friend is an Alien! in the UK and Australia) is a Canadian children's science fiction comedy television series following the chronicles of Pleskit, a purple-skinned, blue-haired alien with an antenna positioned on his head. He tries to fit in and make some friends, but due to his strange appearance, he does never succeed very well. He does make one friend, Tim, who is interested in space and aliens. The two friends go through the sixth grade together. During the series, they solve many unusual problems, from a trans-universal portal game to a blue, wailing pig creature from Pleskit's home planet. The show is premiered on July 13, 1999, ended on January 10, 2001, and was produced by Winklemania Productions and Alliance Atlantis Communications' children's unit, AAC Kids with the participation of the Canadian Television Fund, the Canadian Film Or Video Production Services Tax Credit, and the Shaw Television Broadcast Fund. The series was based on Bruce Coville's book series of the same name.

Episode listing
The series consists of 39 episodes.

Season 1 (1999)
 "They Called Him Pleskit!"
 "Aliens to Blow Up Earth!"
 "Alien Dinner Massacre!"
 "They Saved Grandpa's Brain!"
 "They Shoot, They Splorked!"
 "I Was Dealt a Dung Deal!"
 "Sixth Grade Rebellion Mayhem!"
 "Pre-Teen Party from Outer Space!"
 "The Haunting of Blim Blomkins!"
 "Alien Time Warp Madness!"
 "Alien Dustbuster Bedlam!"
 "My Bodyguard Is a Rat Fink!"
 "Woodlander Bodysnatcher Pandemonium!"
 "Floormat from the Putrid Lagoon!"
 "Invasion of the Substitute Teacher Superfiend!"
 "Alien Snogorama Snafu!"
 "Alien Appliance Outbreak!"
 "Gro-Gro-Grown-Up Dementia!"
 "The Return of Captain Driscoll!"
 "School Dance Gone Wrong!"
 "Escape from Planet Earth!"
 "Attack of the 1000 Foot Veeblax!"

Season 2 (2000-2001)
 "There's an Alien in My Seat!"
 "I Am Larrabe Hicks!"
 "Hevi Hevi Beat Crazy!"
 "Once Upon a Robot!"
 "Alien Tracker Freak-a-Mania!"
 "Bride of Pleskit!"
 "The Revenge of Septic Willy!"
 "Alien Quiz Show!"
 "Escape from Zartopia!" (hereafter only shown on YTV in Canada)
 "McNally the Menace!"
 "Dr. Pleskit and Mr. Ventraa!"
 "Super-Fiend Strikes Back!"
 "Great Coville Galaxies!"
 "A Very Buttsman Christmas"
 "Truth-O-Rama Crunchdown!"
 "His Girlfriend Is an Alien!"
 "To See the Invisible Geek!"

References

External links

Australian Broadcasting Corporation website, "My Best Friend is an Alien".

Canadian children's science fiction television series
1990s Canadian children's television series
2000s Canadian children's television series
1999 Canadian television series debuts
2001 Canadian television series endings
YTV (Canadian TV channel) original programming
Television series by Alliance Atlantis
Television series about extraterrestrial life
Television series based on American novels